Henry Baskerville may refer to:

Albert Henry Baskerville ( 1883–1908), New Zealand postal clerk, rugby union forward and author
Sir Henry Baskerville, a fictional character in the Sherlock Holmes story The Hound of the Baskervilles.